Michael Goodhart is a political scientist and Professor of Political Science and of Gender, Sexuality, and Women's Studies at the University of Pittsburgh. He was Director of Pitt's Global Studies Center from 2017-2021.

Works

References

University of Pittsburgh faculty
21st-century political scientists